Duffields station is a former Baltimore and Ohio Railroad station on the National Register of Historic Places, located in the village of Duffields, West Virginia, near Shenandoah Junction. Built in 1839, the depot is the second oldest surviving B&O depot. Only the Ellicott City Station in Ellicott City, Maryland is older. The depot and its environs were a significant focus of activity during the American Civil War, culminating in the "Greenback Raid" of 1864.

Description
Flowing Springs Road the main road where it crosses the railroad tracks, on Melvin Road, which parallels the tracks. The depot is in two parts, a stone -story gable-roofed structure and a -story wood-framed addition. The stone structure is built into a slope in the manner of a bank barn with the main level on the same grade as the road, falling away on the side facing the tracks. The basement has gradually filled with silt, whose surface is within two feet of the bottoms of the first floor joists.  This section is two bays wide. An interior chimney serves two fireplaces. The walls are built of local limestone with irregular coursing. The addition extends to the west for two bays, continuing the stone building's gable roof, but without a basement. The frame section had a porch on the north side that extended part-way into the stone side.

The interior of the stone section is mainly intact, though much of the plaster has been lost. The first floor of the stone section appears to have been divided lengthways into two long, narrow rooms, with a finished attic above.  The room on the track side has built-in cupboards and pilaster trim. Much of the wood trim remains in this area.  The wood section comprises three rooms, two on the track side and one on the road side, with plaster and simple trim. The attic in this section has two rooms with low windows in the kneewalls. The roof has failed in this area and the plaster is extensively damaged.

Elsewhere on the property, a shed and an outhouse were built in the 1930s. The outhouse is a standard Works Progress Administration design.

History
Duffields was a local stop on the B&O line, serving a rural market. The depot was built as a private venture, and was never owned by the railroad, which had its own station on the other side of the tracks from about 1883 to 1942. Richard Duffield was paid $2500 in compensation for the railroad's right-of-way through his land. Duffield used the money to build the depot with the railroad's blessing, as the railroad preferred to use its capital for the line and to make use of such private depots wherever it could. The depot housed the B&O station master's living and working quarters.

During the American Civil War the station  was the scene of fighting. The depot and its surroundings were guarded by Union forces throughout the war. However, John S. Mosby's 43rd Battalion Virginia Cavalry briefly captured the depot on June 29, 1864. On October 14, 1864, Mosby's rangers cut the tracks and derailed a train near Duffields, in what became known as the "Greenback Raid." Mosby took more than $150,000 in Federal cash from the train.

The depot property was purchased by Duffield Station, Inc. with a long-term goal of restoration for a museum. It was listed on the National Register of Historic Places on  August 3, 2007, as the Duffields Depot.

See also
Duffields (MARC station)

References

Railway stations on the National Register of Historic Places in West Virginia
Buildings and structures in Jefferson County, West Virginia
National Register of Historic Places in Jefferson County, West Virginia
Railway stations in the United States opened in 1839
Former Baltimore and Ohio Railroad stations
Former railway stations in West Virginia